Staffordshire South may refer to:

South Staffordshire District Council, in Staffordshire, England
South Staffordshire (UK Parliament constituency)